The 1910 Kendall Orange and Black football team represented Henry Kendall College (later renamed the University of Tulsa) during the 1910 college football season. The team compiled a 2–1–1 record and was outscored by its opponents by a total of 11 to 10. The team did not play any intercollegiate football games, as its four games were played against local high schools from Broken Arrow, Claremore and Tulsa.

Schedule

References

Kendall
Tulsa Golden Hurricane football seasons
Kendall Orange and Black football